The Office of High Sheriff of the West Midlands is the ceremonial position of High Sheriff appointed to the West Midlands, a metropolitan county in central England. The appointment is made by the British monarch by Pricking the Lists. Created in 1974, the office of High Sheriff of the West Midlands has the duty to "protect and assist in upholding the dignity and well being of His Majesty’s judges and to represent the Queens executive powers in respect of the administration of justice in the county". The Office of High Sheriff is normally awarded to people of stature in the West Midland who have significantly and positively contributed in some way to the county's community either through voluntary work or through commerce or industry.

List of High Sheriffs

1974-1975: Michael Hotham Cadbury, DL, of Selly Oak, Birmingham
1975-1976: Edwin Hardwick Moore, of Ashfurlong Hall, Sutton Coldfield
1976-1977: Lt.-Colonel John Henry Coldwell Horsfall, DSO, MC (& Bar), of Home Farm, Leek Wootton
1977-1978: Michael Gary Southall, of Harborne, Birmingham
1978-1979: Lt.-Colonel Lawrence Willoughby Wilson, TD, JP, of Barlows Road, Edgbaston
1979-1980: Anthony Reginald Wyldbore-Smith, JP, of Elmcroft, Berkswell
1980-1981: David Williams-Thomas, of The Manor House, Birlingham, Pershore
1981-1982: David Gwyn Justham, of Edgbaston, Birmingham
1982-1983: Anthony Frederic Birtles, FRICS, Cutlers Farm, Wootton Wawen
1983-1984: Hugh Kenrick, MA, of Farquhar Road, Edgbaston
1984-1985: Derek Montague Percy Lea, JP, FRICS, of Rosedale, Moseley
1985-1986: Richard Leslie Harris, FCA, of Oldswinford, Stourbridge
1986-1987: William Eric Husselby, FIPA, of Fen End House, Kenilworth
1987-1988: Patrick William Welch, BA, of Wellington Road, Edgbaston
1988-1989: Francis Charles Graves, OBE, FRICS, FCIOB, DL, of Aldersyde, Tanworth-in-Arden
1989-1990: David John Crump Johnson of Shenstone, Kidderminster 
1990-1991: David Lovell Burbidge
1991-1992: Bruce Winton Tanner of Moseley, Birmingham
1992-1993: John Anthony Jefferson
1993-1994: John Ian Westwood
1994-1995: Sir George Adrian Hayhurst Cadbury, DL, MA, Hon DSc, Hon LL D, of Knowle, Solihull
1995-1996: Professor Sir Frederick William Crawford of Arthur Road, Edgbaston
1996-1997: John David Saville
1997-1998: Edward Michael Worley
1998-1999: William George Key Carter of Elmey Lovett, Droitwich
1999-2000: Roger Stephen Burman
2000-2001: Jeremy Frederick Woolridge 
2001-2002: Mrs Tessa King-Farlow of Edgbaston, Birmingham
2002-2003: Gary James Allen
2003-2004: Michael Evans
2004-2005: John Leslie Andrews 
2005-2006: Roger Joseph Dickens
2006-2007: John Rawcliffe Airey Crabtree
2007-2008: Robert Peter Tomlinson
2008-2009: Byron Head of Barnt Green 
2009-2010: Paul Bassi of Stourbridge 
2010-2011: Anita Kumari Bhalla of Handsworth Wood 
2011-2012: David L Grove of Henley in Arden 
2012-2013: Stewart Towe of Smethwick 
2013–2014: Dame Christine Braddock of Birmingham 
2014–2015: Dr Tim Watts 
2015-2016: Jonnie Turpie
2016–2017: Dr Keith Bradshaw 
2017–2018: John L. Hudson
2018–2019: Christopher Thomas Loughran 
2019–2020: Michael Kuo of Edgbaston, Birmingham 
2020–2021: Wade Cleone Lyn, CBE of Birmingham 
2021–2022:
2022–2023: David Robert Moorcroft, OBE
2023–2024: Wade Cleone Lyn, CBE of Birmingham

References

Whitaker's Almanack, various editions
Birmingham Post and Mail Year Book and Who's Who, various editions
 highsheriffs.com, both current and through archive.org

 
West Midlands
Local government in the West Midlands (county)
High Sheriffs